is a Japanese model, actress, and singer from Kanagawa, Japan and is employed by A-team Production. In 2006, Megumi Kobayashi made her debut as a Jazz singer with new name "meg".

Filmography 
 Rebirth of Mothra
 Rebirth of Mothra II
 Rebirth of Mothra III
 Gamera the Brave

External links 
 
FM Yokohama DJ profile 

1977 births
Japanese actresses
Living people